The Tumalo volcanic center of Central Oregon is viewed as a source of large-volume Pleistocene ashflows, in the US state of Oregon.

The eruption, ashflows included

How big was the volcanic eruption?

Ashflows include

 Desert Spring Tuff,
 Bend Pumice
 Tumalo Tuff, and 
 Shevlin Park Tuff.

The area has many rhyolitic domes, such as Melvin Butte, plus andesitic cinder cones, including those of the Triangle Hill and Triangle Peak area, whose composition is similar to the Tumalo Tuff (and Bend Pumice), and Shevlin Park Tuff.

This area has andesitic and mafic cinder cones, such as Lava Butte. and rhyolite domes. Viscous rhyolite domes extruded to the surface.

Ways the Tumalo Volcanic Center's ashflows have been used

The Tumalo Volcanic Center's ashy pumice was quarried for concrete. This concrete effectively built the city of Bend, Oregon

Pumice from the Tumalo Volcanic Center composes Oregon State University–Cascades's expansion, into a pumice mine.

See also

 Tumalo Mountain

External links and references

 Volcanocafe, has information about the Tumalo Volcanic Center
 Information on Tumalo Volcanic Center's vent

References

Geologic formations of Oregon
Pleistocene volcanism